Brett Carolan (born March 16, 1971 in San Rafael, California) is a former professional American football player. He  played tight end in the National Football League (NFL) for three seasons with the San Francisco 49ers and Miami Dolphins.  He was a rookie with the 49ers in 1994, when the team won Super Bowl XXIX.

Born and raised in Marin County, Carolan played college football at Washington State University in 

His father, Reggie Carolan (1939–1983), was a tight end in the American Football League for seven seasons, with the San Diego Chargers and Kansas City Chiefs. He also played college football (and basketball) on the Palouse, at the University of Idaho in Moscow.

References

External links

1971 births
American football tight ends
Washington State Cougars football players
San Francisco 49ers players
Miami Dolphins players
Living people
Sportspeople from San Rafael, California